The Mount Clunie National Park is a protected national park that is located in the Northern Rivers region of New South Wales, Australia. The park's north-eastern limits define the state border between New South Wales and Queensland. The average elevation of the terrain is 634 meters above sea level.

The park is part of the Focal Peak Group World Heritage Site Gondwana Rainforests of Australia inscribed in 1986 and added to the Australian National Heritage List in 2007.

The park is also part of the Scenic Rim Important Bird Area, identified as such by BirdLife International because of its importance in the conservation of several species of threatened birds.

See also

 Protected areas of New South Wales

References

National parks of New South Wales
Protected areas established in 1999
Gondwana Rainforests of Australia
1999 establishments in Australia
Important Bird Areas of New South Wales
Northern Rivers